An epithet is a byname, or a descriptive term (word or phrase), accompanying or occurring in place of a name and having entered common usage. Certain epithets have been used for numerous people throughout history.

A–C 

 Accursed
 Angel
 Apostle of the North
 Bad
 Bald
 Bearded
 Beautiful
 Black
 Blind
 Bold
 Brave
 Chaste
 Conqueror
 Courageous
 Cruel

D–F 

 Drunkard
 Evil
 Fair
 Fat
 Fearless
 Fortunate

G–H 

 Generous
 Gentle
 Good
 Great
 Grim
 Hairy
 Handsome
 Hermit
 Holy
 Hunchback

J–M 

 Just
 Lame
 Learned
 Lion
 Little
 Lucky
 Mad
 Magnanimous
 Magnificent
 Merciful
 Mighty
 Mild
 Monk

N–P 

 Navigator
 Old
 One-Eyed
 Peaceful
 Pious
 Posthumous
 Proud
 Prudent

R–T 

 Rash
 Recluse
 Red
 Rich
 Short
 Silent
 Simple
 Small
 Stammerer
 Steadfast
 Stout
 Strict
 Strong
 Tall
 Terrible

U–Y 

 Unfortunate
 Valiant
 Venerable
 Warlike
 White
 Wild
 Wise
 Young

See also 
 List of monarchs by nickname

References